The 943rd Rescue Group  is a reserve component of the United States Air Force. It is assigned to Tenth Air Force under the Air Force Reserve Command and is based in Davis-Monthan Air Force Base, Arizona. When mobilized, Air Combat Command directs group assets into theater to support wartime tasking and other operations, like humanitarian relief. United States Northern Command may gain group assets directly to support disaster relief, search and rescue tasking in the aftermath of catastrophic events like hurricane, tornado, wildfire, flooding and earthquake, when they occur in the US, or its territories.

The group and its subordinate squadrons are assigned to the 920th Rescue Wing based at Patrick Space Force Base, Florida.

Mission
The mission of the 943rd Rescue Group is to provide leadership, management, policy formulation, planning, and standardization for operations, training and support of Air Force Reserve Command rescue assets, consisting of 3 squadrons and 3 flights at Davis-Monthan AFB and 1 additional squadron at Portland Air Reserve Station, Oregon.  The group is equipped with six (6) Sikorsky HH-60 Pave Hawk helicopters at Davis-Monthan Air Force Base to support worldwide combat rescue operations.

As an Air Force Reserve Command unit, the 943rd is under the control of the 920th Rescue Wing at Patrick Space Force Base, Florida and is the only Air Force Reserve rescue unit in the Southwestern United States. Upon mobilization, the 943rd would come under the control of the Air Combat Command.

History

Need for reserve troop carrier groups
After May 1959, the reserve flying force consisted of 45 troop carrier squadrons assigned to 15 troop carrier wings. The squadrons were not all located with their parent wings, but were spread over thirty-five Air Force, Navy and civilian airfields under what was called the Detached Squadron Concept.  The concept offered several advantages.  Communities were more likely to accept the smaller squadrons than the large wings and the location of separate squadrons in smaller population centers would facilitate recruiting and manning. However, under this concept, all support organizations were located with the wing headquarters. Although this was not a problem when the entire wing was called to active service, mobilizing a single flying squadron and elements to support it proved difficult.  This weakness was demonstrated in the partial mobilization of reserve units during the Berlin Crisis of 1961.  To resolve this, at the start of 1962, Continental Air Command, (ConAC) determined to reorganize its reserve wings by establishing groups with support elements for each of its troop carrier squadrons.  This reorganization would facilitate mobilization of elements of wings in various combinations when needed.

Activation of the 943rd Troop Carrier Group
As a result, the 943rd Troop Carrier Group was established at March Air Force Base, California on 17 January 1963 as the headquarters for the 729th Troop Carrier Squadron, which had been stationed there since October 1960. Along with group headquarters, a Combat Support Squadron, Materiel Squadron and a Tactical Infirmary were organized to support the 729th.  The group was equipped with Fairchild C-119 Flying Boxcars for Tactical Air Command airlift operations.

The group was one of four C-119 groups assigned to the 452nd Troop Carrier Wing in 1963.  The others were the 942nd and 944th Troop Carrier Groups, also at March, and the 945th Troop Carrier Group at Hill Air Force Base, Utah.

The group flew routine tactical airlift missions in the western states, inactivating its Flying Boxcars in 1969.  It then was moved east to Charleston Air Force Base, South Carolina, where it was updated to the Lockheed C-141 Starlifter heavy intercontinental transport. the group's crews augmented Military Airlift Command units for strategic airlift missions worldwide, including contingency and humanitarian operations and took part in strategic mobility exercises for training.  Inactivated in 1973 as part of an Air Force Reserve reorganization.

Reactivated at March Air Force Base in 1985 with Lockheed C-130 Hercules transports.   Inactivated in 1993 when the 302nd Tactical Airlift Wing was moved to Norton Air Force Base and the reserve's C-141s were moved to March.

Rescue Group
The 943rd Rescue Group was reactivated in the Air Force Reserve on 12 February 2005 at Davis-Monthan Air Force Base.

Lineage
 Established as the 943rd Troop Carrier Group, Medium and activated on 28 December 1962 (not organized)
 Organized in the reserve on 17 January 1963
 Redesignated 943rd Tactical Airlift Group on 1 July 1967
 Inactivated on 25 April 1969
 Redesignated 943rd Military Airlift Group (Associate) on 31 July 1969
 Activated in the reserve on 25 September 1969
 Inactivated on 1 July 1973
 Redesignated 943rd Tactical Airlift Group on 8 January 1985
 Activated in the reserve on 1 April 1985
 Redesignated 943rd Airlift Group on 1 February 1992
 Inactivated on 30 June 1993
 Redesignated 943rd Rescue Group on 13 January 2005
 Activated in the reserve on 12 February 2005

Assignments
 Continental Air Command, 28 December 1962 (not organized)
 452nd Troop Carrier Wing (later 452nd Military Airlift Wing), 17 January 1963 – 25 April 1969
 514th Military Airlift Wing, 25 September 1969 – 1 July 1973
 302nd Tactical Airlift Wing, 1 April 1985
 445th Airlift Wing, 1 February 1992 – 30 June 1993
 920th Rescue Wing, 12 February 2005 – present

Components
 943rd Operations Group: 1 August 1992 – 30 June 1993
 300th Military Airlift Squadron: 25 September 1969 – 1 July 1973
 303rd Tactical Airlift Squadron (later 303rd Airlift Squadron): 1 April 1985 – 1 August 1992
 304th Rescue Squadron: 12 February 2005 – present
 305th Rescue Squadron: 12 February 2005 – present
 306th Rescue Squadron: 12 February 2005 – present
 701st Military Airlift Squadron: 25 September 1970 – 1 July 1973
 707th Military Airlift Squadron: 1 October 1972 – 1 July 1973
 729th Troop Carrier Squadron (later 729th Tactical Airlift Squadron): 17 January 1963 – 25 April 1969

Stations
 March Air Force Base, California, 17 January 1963 – 25 April 1969
 Charleston Air Force Base, South Carolina, 25 September 1969 – 1 July 1973
 March Air Force Base, California, 1 April 1985 – 30 June 1993
 Davis-Monthan Air Force Base, Arizona, 12 February 2005 – present

Aircraft

 Fairchild C-119 Flying Boxcar (1963–1969)
 Lockheed C-141 Starlifter (1969–1973)
 Lockheed C-5 Galaxy (1973)
 Lockheed C-130 Hercules (1985–1993)
 Lockheed HC-130 (2005–present)
 Sikorsky HH-60G Pave Hawk (2005–present)

References
 Notes

 Citations

Bibliography

External links
 Davis-Monthan AFB – Other Units & Agencies
 Citizen Airman – New Combat Rescue Group Stands Up in Arizona

943
Military units and formations of the United States Air Force Reserves
1963 establishments in California